Zymergen is an American biotechnology company based in Emeryville, California. The company applies genomics and machine learning to research and design chemical producing genetically modified organisms. Shortly after going public in 2021, it was reported that the company was facing difficulties in manufacturing products and struggling to make revenue. In July 2022, Ginkgo Bioworks agreed to acquire Zymergen for $300 million.

History
Zymergen was founded in 2013. The company uses machine learning and artificial intelligence to study and modify microbes which produce chemicals. Many of the chemical compounds produced by these organisms are used in manufacturing consumer goods or pharmaceuticals.

The company raised $2 million in 2013, $44 million in 2015, $130 million from SoftBank's Vision Fund in 2016, $400 million in 2018, and $300 million in 2020. The company reportedly included DARPA and Fortune 500 companies among its customers by 2016. In 2018, Zymergen acquired fellow biotechnology firm Radiant Genomics.

The company released its first product, Hyaline, in December 2020. Hyaline, a bio-manufactured optical polymer film, was marketed for use with consumer electronics such as flexible smartphones and tablets.

In April 2021, the company went public with a $500 million IPO. The IPO was led by JPMorgan Chase and Goldman Sachs. 

Regulatory filings with the U.S. Securities and Exchange Commission in July revealed that the company had made only $13 million in revenue during 2020, and had lost over $262 million. The filings also revealed that the company was struggling to produce Hyaline, and that two of its companies had complained did not mesh with their manufacturing process. When these operational problems became public it resulted in a sharp reduction in market capitalization and shareholder lawsuits were filed shortly after. 

Co-founder Josh Hoffman's resignation as CEO in August 2021 caused Zymergen's stock to plunge. He was replaced by acting CEO Jay Flatley, who is also currently Zymergen's chairman and Illumina, Inc.'s former CEO.

After Zymergen's stock prices crashed, investor Cathie Wood began buying up its shares, which raised prices again.

In the wake of these financial issues, the company began restructuring to cut costs, including renegotiating loans, laying off hundreds of employees, and restructuring lease expenses for office space. Company founder Jed Dean also departed from the company.

In November 2021, Zymergen announced that it had abandoned the production of Hyaline, and would be focusing on drug and vaccine development.

The company's highly publicized difficulties in bringing its projected products to market and has drawn comparisons to other biotechnology companies such as Amyris and Theranos.

In July 2022, Ginkgo Bioworks agreed to acquire Zymergen for $300 million in an all-stock deal.

See also
 Amyris
 Precigen

References

External links
 

2013 establishments in California
2022 mergers and acquisitions
Biotechnology companies of the United States
Companies based in California
Companies formerly listed on the Nasdaq